Andaman Club is a five-star island casino and golf resort in Burma. It is located on 730 ha (1,800 acres) of Thahtay Kyun Island within the Mergui Archipelago in the Andaman Sea. Directly adjacent to Ranong, in the south of Thailand and to King Bayint Nbung (formerly Victoria Point) is a region famous for its gems, pearls, flora and fauna. It is owned and operated by the VES Group of Thailand, under a long-term concession from the Burmese government.

In 2016, Andaman Club is operated by Grand Andaman Travel. It is said to have ownership transfer from VES group to a Burmease/Thai name Kyaw Lwin.

Included
Its facilities include a 205-room hotel, an 18-hole golf course designed by Jack Nicklaus, a casino, a water sports and scuba facility, a zoo, a fitness centre, a discothèque-cum-karaoke club, restaurants, a bar lounge, a 24-hour café, a business centre and duty-free shopping.

External links
Grand Andaman Hotel

References

Sports venues in Myanmar
Golf clubs and courses in Myanmar
Golf clubs and courses designed by Jack Nicklaus
Resorts in Myanmar
Hotels in Myanmar